The 2018 Lamar Hunt U.S. Open Cup tournament proper will feature teams from all five tiers of the men's American soccer pyramid. A record 108 open division amateur teams have entered qualifying this year.

US Soccer oversaw the qualifying process that was formerly handled by each association. All teams within the Division I and II professional leagues qualified automatically as in past years. Any open division national league could use its previous year's league standings as its qualification method. Remaining open division teams participated in qualifying rounds to determine entrants into the tournament proper. Final slot allocation was determined when team registration concluded.

National league track

Premier Development League

On March 14, 2018, it was announced that 20 PDL teams would be participating in the 2018 U.S. Open Cup. The teams are

Charlotte Eagles,
FC Golden State Force,
FC Miami City,
FC Tucson,
Lakeland Tropics,
Long Island Rough Riders,
Michigan Bucks,
Mississippi Brilla,
Myrtle Beach Mutiny,
New York Red Bulls U-23,
Ocean City Nor'easters,
OKC Energy U23,
Portland Timbers U23,
Reading United A.C.,
San Francisco City FC,
Seacoast United Phantoms,
SIMA Aguilas,
South Georgia Tormenta FC,
The Villages SC,
Western Mass Pioneers

National Premier Soccer League

On March 14, 2018, it was announced that 19 NPSL teams would be participating in the 2018 U.S. Open Cup. The teams are

AFC Ann Arbor,
Brooklyn Italians,
CD Aguiluchos USA,
Dakota Fusion FC,
Detroit City FC,
Duluth FC,
Elm City Express,
Erie Commodores FC,
FC Arizona,
FC Motown,
FC Wichita,
Fort Worth Vaqueros FC,
Inter Nashville FC,
Kingston Stockade FC,
 Kitsap Pumas,
Miami United FC,
Midland-Odessa FC,
New Orleans Jesters,
Orange County FC

Local qualifying track
All qualifying matches took place in 2017.

First qualifying round

Northeast Region

Southeast Region
Byes:  Cajun Soccer Club,  Nashville United

Mountain Region
Byes:  Galati FC,  Sporting AZ FC

Pacific Region

Second qualifying round

Northeast Region

Southeast Region

Miami Nacional SC conceded the game at halftime.

Mountain Region

Pacific Region

Third qualifying round

Northeast Region

Southeast Region

Mountain Region

Pacific Region

 El Farolito joined the National Premier Soccer League (NPSL) as an expansion team on November 20, 2017. Clubs must remain playing members in good standing within their leagues from the date of the open division entry deadline through the date of the U.S. Open Cup Final in order to be eligible to compete in the U.S. Open Cup. Since El Farolito left the San Francisco Soccer Football League to join the NPSL, the club became ineligible for the 2018 U.S. Open Cup.

References

Further reading

External links
 U.S. Soccer Federation

U.S. Open Cup
2017 in American soccer